Return to New York may refer to:

 Return to New York, storyarc of the Eastman and Laird's Teenage Mutant Ninja Turtles comics
 Return to New York, an episode of the 2003–2009 animated Teenage Mutant Ninja Turtles television series
 Return to New York, an episode of the 2012–2017 animated Teenage Mutant Ninja Turtles television series
 Return to New York (Jeeves and Wooster), an episode of the British comedy television series Jeeves and Wooster